Paddy Crehan (18 February 1920 – 11 February 1992) was an Irish basketball player. He competed in the men's tournament at the 1948 Summer Olympics.

References

External links
 

1920 births
1992 deaths
Irish men's basketball players
Olympic basketball players of Ireland
Basketball players at the 1948 Summer Olympics
Sportspeople from County Clare